Pat Casey (born 11 March 1962) is an Irish Fianna Fáil politician who has been a Senator for the Labour Panel since April 2020. He previously served as a Teachta Dála (TD) for the Wicklow constituency from 2016 to 2020.

He is a native of Laragh, County Wicklow, but he is based in Glendalough, and owns the local hotel. He is a nephew of Bishop Eamonn Casey. He was elected to Wicklow County Council as an Independent candidate in 2004, and joined Fianna Fáil in 2007. He was Chairman of Wicklow County Council from 2012 to 2013. He has also been active in the GAA.

He lost his Dáil seat at the 2020 general election. In April 2020, he was elected to Seanad Éireann as a Senator for the Labour Panel.

References

External links
Pat Casey's page on the Fianna Fáil website

1962 births
Year of birth uncertain
Living people
Fianna Fáil TDs
Gaelic games players from County Wicklow
Independent politicians in Ireland
Irish hoteliers
Local councillors in County Wicklow
Members of the 32nd Dáil
People from County Wicklow
Members of the 26th Seanad
Fianna Fáil senators